The Mississippi School for Mathematics and Science (MSMS) is Mississippi's only public residential high school for academically gifted students and is located in Columbus, Mississippi, United States on the campus of the Mississippi University for Women. A member of the National Consortium for Secondary STEM Schools (NCSSS), it is a statewide public magnet school.

Tenth-grade students are selected to attend through a competitive application process that includes standardized test scores, a written application, and an interview.  The school enrolls students in the last two years of high school graduating over 100 students each year.  In 2021, the school produced 21 National Merit Semifinalists.  While the main academic focus of MSMS is mathematics and science, humanities, particularly history, literature, and art are also emphasized.

History
Mississippi School for Mathematics and Science (MSMS) was founded in 1987 by appropriations from the Mississippi Legislature and was the fourth public, residential high school for academically gifted students created in the United States.

As a public, residential high school, drawing students from all over the state, MSMS has occasionally struggled for existence.  The property tax has been the sole form of finance for most schools in Mississippi. However, MSMS which draws students from all over the state, cannot levy a millage tax as a source of funding.  It relies on grants as well as state, student, and alumni contributions.

Starting in 2008, the Mississippi Legislature required MSMS and its sister school, the Mississippi School of the Arts, to charge students $500 per semester for room and board costs, making them the only public schools in the state that charge students to attend. However, if a student is eligible for free or reduced lunch in their home district, then this fee is waived.

During the COVID-19 pandemic, MSMS transitioned to an online-learning environment, beginning at the end of March 2020, using Zoom and other telecommunications services. During the 2020–2021 academic year, the school utilized a hybrid learning environment, allowing some students to remain virtual while others attended in-person classes and lived on campus with quarantining restrictions.

Notable alumni
Elizabeth Wayne (biomedical engineer), TED Fellow
Leslie & Mark Henderson, founders of Lazy Magnolia Brewing Company
Desmond Walker, Commander, US Navy; Executive Officer, USS Bainbridge (DDG-96)
Kajal Desai, co-founder of Doonya (Indian/Bollywood dance-fitness movement)

See also

 Alabama School of Mathematics and Science
 Arkansas School for Mathematics, Sciences, and the Arts
 Carol Martin Gatton Academy of Mathematics and Science in Kentucky
 Craft Academy for Excellence in Science and Mathematics
 Illinois Mathematics and Science Academy
 Indiana Academy for Science, Mathematics, and Humanities
 Kansas Academy of Mathematics and Science
 Louisiana School for Math, Science, and the Arts
 Maine School of Science and Mathematics 
 North Carolina School of Science and Mathematics
 Oklahoma School of Science and Mathematics
 South Carolina Governor's School for Science and Mathematics
 Texas Academy of Mathematics and Science

References

External links
 MSMS homepage
 MSMS Foundation

Columbus, Mississippi
Boarding schools in Mississippi
Public high schools in Mississippi
Magnet schools in Mississippi
NCSSS schools
Educational institutions established in 1987
Mississippi University for Women
Schools in Lowndes County, Mississippi
Science and technology in Mississippi
1987 establishments in Mississippi
Public boarding schools in the United States